The Talbot County-class tank landing ships was a class of tank landing ship of the United States Navy. They were the only steam-powered LSTs built.

Ships of class

References

 
Amphibious warfare vessel classes
Tank landing ships